Glendevie is a rural locality in the local government area of Huon Valley in the South-east region of Tasmania. The 2016 census has a population of 64 for the state suburb of Glendevie.

History
Glendevie was gazetted as a locality in 1965.

Geography
Most of the boundaries of the locality are survey lines.

Road infrastructure
The A6 route (Huon Highway) enters from the north-east and runs through to the south-east, where it exits. Route C637 (Police Point Road) starts at an intersection with A6 and runs south-east through the locality until it exits.

References

Localities of Huon Valley Council
Towns in Tasmania